Santana is the third studio album by the American rock band Santana. The band's second self-titled album, it is often referred to as III or Santana III to distinguish it from the band's 1969 debut album. The album was also known as Man with an Outstretched Hand, after its album cover image. It was the third and last album by the Woodstock-era lineup, until their reunion on Santana IV in 2016.  It was also considered by many to be the band's peak commercially and musically, as subsequent releases aimed towards more experimental jazz fusion and Latin music. The album also marked the addition of 17-year-old guitarist Neal Schon to the group.

Release and reception
The original album was recorded at Columbia Studios, San Francisco, and released in both stereo and quadraphonic.

The album featured two singles that charted in the United States. "Everybody's Everything" peaked at No. 12 in October 1971, while "No One to Depend On", an uncredited adaptation of Willie Bobo's boogaloo standard "Spanish Grease", received significant airplay on FM radio and peaked at No. 36 in March 1972. Santana III was also the last Santana album to hit #1 on the charts until Supernatural in 1999. The 2005 edition of Guinness World Records stated that was the longest gap between #1 albums ever occurring (a record which is now held by Paul McCartney since his seventeenth solo studio album, Egypt Station, topped the Billboard 200 chart on 2018, his first since his 1982's Tug of War). The original album was re-released in 1998 with live versions of "Batuka", "Jungle Strut" and a previously unreleased song, "Gumbo", recorded at Fillmore West in 1971 which features lead guitar solos by both Santana and Schon.

As was done with the band's debut album, released two years earlier, in 2006 Sony released the "Legacy Edition" of the album, featuring the original album in re-mastered sound, and bonus material:
 Three other songs recorded in the sessions for the album
 The single version of "No One to Depend On"
 The complete 1971 Fillmore West concert (from which the 1998 bonus tracks were taken)

The original Quadraphonic mix of the album was remastered and released on multichannel SACD by Sony Japan in 2021.

Track listing

Standard edition

2006 Legacy Edition

Tracks 2–4, 6, 9, 10: previously unissued
Tracks 1, 5, 11: from the 1998 reissue of Santana III (see above)
Tracks 7–8: previously released on the album Fillmore: The Last Days (recorded 29 June – 4 July 1971, released in 1972, containing performances by 14 different bands)

Singles
 1971 - "Everybody's Everything" (#3 Canada)
 1972 - "No One to Depend On" (#17 Canada)

Personnel
 Gregg Rolie – lead vocals, keyboards, piano, producer
 Carlos Santana – guitar, vocals, lead vocals on "Everything's Coming Our Way," producer
 Neal Schon – guitar, producer
 David Brown – bass, producer, engineer
 Michael Shrieve – drums, percussion, producer
 José "Chepito" Areas – percussion, conga, timbales, drums, producer
 Mike Carabello – percussion, conga, tambourine, vocals, producer

Additional personnel
 Rico Reyes – percussion, vocals, lead vocals on "Guajira"
 Thomas "Coke" Escovedo – percussion, vocals
 Luis Gasca – trumpet on "Para los Rumberos"
 Mario Ochoa – piano solo on "Guajira"
 Tower of Power – horn section on "Everybody's Everything"
 Linda Tillery – background vocals
 Greg Errico – tambourine
 John Fiore – engineer

Charts

Weekly charts

Year-end charts

Certifications

References

External links 
 Santana - Santana III (1971) album releases & credits at Discogs.com
 Santana - Santana III (1971) album user reviews & credits at ProgArchives.com
 Santana - Santana III (1971) album review by Thom Jurek, credits, releases and Billboard charts at AllMusic.com

Santana III
Santana III
Columbia Records albums
Legacy Recordings albums
Albums produced by Carlos Santana
Albums recorded at the Fillmore
2006 live albums